Hydropionea is a genus of moths of the family Crambidae. The 13 described species are distributed in Central and South America.

The genus was formerly treated in Spilomelinae, but it is now placed in Glaphyriinae.

The larvae are found to feed on Capparis uniflora (Capparaceae), which fits with the general feeding habit of the subfamily Glaphyriinae of feeding on Brassicales.

Species
Hydropionea barnesalis (Dyar, 1923)
Hydropionea brevicans (Dyar, 1923)
Hydropionea dentata (Druce, 1895)
Hydropionea fenestralis (Barnes & McDunnough, 1914)
Hydropionea lavinia (Schaus, 1912)
Hydropionea melliculalis Lederer, 1863
Hydropionea oblectalis (Hulst, 1886)
Hydropionea protopennis (Dyar, 1923)
Hydropionea pseudopis (Dyar, 1914)
Hydropionea rufalis (Hampson, 1917)
Hydropionea rusina (Druce, 1895)
Hydropionea schausalis (Dyar, 1923)
Hydropionea sufflexalis (Dyar, 1914)

References

Glaphyriinae
Crambidae genera
Taxa named by George Hampson